The White River Light is a lighthouse on Lake Michigan near the city of Whitehall, Michigan.  It sits on a thin peninsula of land separating Lake Michigan from White Lake.  The building was built in 1875.

Some of the buildings in existence for the lightstation consisted of the tower and attached dwelling, the South Pier-head Beacon light, oil house, woodshed or storage building and Privy. It is one of four lighthouses that are operated by the Sable Points Lighthouse Keepers Association.

Captain William Robinson was the first lighthouse keeper, working there for 47 years. He lived there with his wife and thirteen children. His residence was built out of limestone, the same material as that the forty foot octagonal tower connected to it was built out of. Towards the end of his life, Robinson walked with a cane. The lighthouse is said to be haunted, with people hearing the tapping of Robinson's cane. Frances Marshall, known as the last female lighthouse keeper in Michigan, worked there after his service.

The lighthouse served as a guide to the river until 1960, when it was decommissioned. Fruitland Township acquired the lighthouse in 1966 and built a museum in 1970. Visitors can climb the spiral staircase or look at the original Fourth Order Fresnel lens. It is open to the public as a museum with regular hours posted from Memorial Weekend through August 31.  The lighthouse is also open through September and October with reduced hours.  The museum has a number of artifacts from the passenger and freight shipping on the lakes in addition to information on the light itself.

See also
Lighthouses in the United States

Notes

External links

Official Site for the White River Lighthouse Museum
Beacons in the Night, Michigan Lighthouse Chronology, Clarke Historical Library, Central Michigan University.
Lighthouse Central,  Photographs, History, Directions and Way points for White River Light, The Ultimate Guide to West Michigan Lighthouses by Jerry Roach (Publisher: Bugs Publishing LLC - 2005). .
White River Light Page from Seeing the Light
Page from Maritime Heritage Program's Inventory of Historic Light Stations

White River Light Page at Lighthousefreinds.com
White River Page from Michigan Lighthouse Conservancy
White River Lighthouse - United States Lighthouses

Lighthouses completed in 1875
Houses completed in 1875
Lighthouse museums in Michigan
Museums in Muskegon County, Michigan